Pseudophilautus schneideri (Schneider's shrub frog) is a species of frogs in the family Rhacophoridae, endemic to Sri Lanka.

References

schneideri
Endemic fauna of Sri Lanka
Frogs of Sri Lanka
Amphibians described in 2011